Brian Vincent (born 16 February 1960) is an Australian cricketer. He played in six first-class and five List A matches for South Australia between 1979 and 1982.

See also
 List of South Australian representative cricketers

References

External links
 

1960 births
Living people
Australian cricketers
South Australia cricketers
Cricketers from Adelaide